Indian Bay (Parsons Point) is located in Newfoundland, Canada.

Geography
Situated on the northwest arm of Bonavista Bay, Indian Bay was until the late 19th century the only mainland community located between Salvage and Greenspond.

History

Records show that Indian Bay was the only inhabited settlement in that region that was connected to the mainland part of the Island of Newfoundland until the 19th century. It was also known as Northwest Arm, and later for a period of time, as Parson's Point, after the surname of its first English settlers. Europeans first came to Indian Bay in the 18th century to fish for salmon. In 1720 George Skeffington was salmon fishing there and by 1786 there were eight salmon operations in the area. Permanent settlement began after 1800. The 1836 Census of Newfoundland records Indian Bay as having a population of five, William Parsons and his family. The population was slow in growing, and in 1901 there were 40 people living there. The main source of employment was three sawmills, and a lobster factory was established before 1911. In 1921 the "International Power and Paper Co." arrived in Indian Bay and that same year a school was constructed. The peak of Indian Bay's population was in 1961 with 285 people; afterwards the population began to decline.

Indian Bay is well known for its sports fishing, mainly for Brook Trout and Atlantic Salmon. The community has a licensed salmon river called , Indian Bay River, but locally known as, "The Brook", that runs through the town. Fishing is still a very popular sport in the area and with its many ATV and Snowmobile trails (old Bowater's woods roads), Indian Bay is a very popular destination for those that enjoy the great outdoors and everything it has to offer.

Demographics 

Directory
- Hutchinson's Newfoundland Directory 1864-1865 lists:
 Joseph Osmond, ship carpenter
 Phillip Parsons, ship carpenter

- Lovell's Newfoundland Directory describes Indian Bay as a small fishing community on the west side of Bonavista Bay, distant from Greenspond by 15 miles on boat. The 1871 population was 5. The directory lists one person:
 Adam Parsons, Fisherman.

See also
 List of cities and towns in Newfoundland and Labrador

References

External links
 http://ngb.chebucto.org/ 
 http://www.ucs.mun.ca/~hrollman/index.html
 http://www.rootsweb.com/~cannf/bbnor.htm
Indian Bay - Encyclopedia of Newfoundland and Labrador, vol. 3, p. 35.

Populated coastal places in Canada
Towns in Newfoundland and Labrador